Asia Motors Industries, traded as Asia Motors, was a South Korean car manufacturer established in 1965 and closed in 1999. From 1976 onwards, it was a subsidiary of Kia Motors.

History 

In 1962,  as one of the measures to comply its First Five-Year Economic Development Plan, the Korean government passed a law exempting from taxes imported parts to assemble KD cars locally. In 1965, as a result of these incentives,  Asia Motor Industries was established in Gwangju through the financial support of entrepreneur Lee Mun-hwan. The company was initially manufacturing military vehicles, trucks and buses but soon it began negotiations with Fiat  and in 1970 it started to assemble Fiat 124 models. It diversified into the SUV and heavy vehicles market, including large and medium duty trucks, special military vehicles, lightweight cars, civilian jeeps (a small jeep look-alike called the Rocsta and later the Retona), motor vehicle components, to include engines, and buses and mini-buses. In 1969, Asia Motors was acquired by Dongkuk Steel. In 1973, the South Korean government launched a plan to promote the production of low-cost cars for export. Asia Motors was unable to satisfy the plan's conditions, losing its car assembly permits,  and was purchased by Kia in 1976, as the government promised Kia, in exchange of doing so, a monopoly of the military vehicle production for South Korea. In 1978, Asia Motors signed an agreement with Hino Motors of Japan with the aim of achieving economies of scale for its low-volume products.  Hyundai in turn purchased Kia and the Asia brand was discontinued in 1999. The Rocsta's replacement, the Retona, was sold under the Kia brand.

Failed Brazilian production
In 1994, Asia Motors do Brasil, an independent importer of Asia vehicles, was established in Brazil. Asia Motors do Brasil achieved some sales success and, in 1996, it signed an agreement with the Brazilian government for building an assembly plant at Camaçari in exchange of tax exemptions for imported vehicles. The plant was never completed, and the unpaid taxes prevented Kia from building a factory in the country until 2013, when the Brazilian justice determined Kia was not bound to pay them, as it was not related to the importer.

Vehicles

Passenger vehicles

Fiat 124
Rocsta
Retona

Vans
Asia Topic (Mazda Bongo/Kia Bongo I)
Asia Towner (Daihatsu Hijet/Kia Towner)

Small / medium-sized buses

Asia Combi (AM805/815/825)
Asia AM808 (Hino Liesse)
Asia Cosmos (AM818) (Hino Rainbow)

Large bus

Asia AM927 / AM937 / AM928 (city buses), AM929, AM939, AM949 (Gran Bird)

Truck
Asia Granto (AM) truck (Hino Ranger)
Asia AM420 (Hino Profia)

Other
KM900 APC - license version of the Fiat 6614 Armoured Personnel Carrier for Republic of Korea Army.
Massey Ferguson 362A - Asia Motors also assembled/distributed Massey Ferguson tractors.
Massey Ferguson 390A - Asia Motors also assembled/distributed Massey Ferguson tractors.

References

External links

The history of Asia Motors Australia

Vehicle manufacturing companies established in 1965
Vehicle manufacturing companies disestablished in 1999
Kia Motors
Defunct motor vehicle manufacturers of South Korea